Trout are species of freshwater fish belonging to the genera Oncorhynchus, Salmo and Salvelinus, all of which are of the subfamily Salmoninae of the family Salmonidae.  The word trout is also used as part of the name of some non-salmonid fish such as Cynoscion nebulosus, the spotted seatrout or speckled trout.

Trout are closely related to salmon and char (or charr): species termed salmon and char occur in the same genera as do fish called trout (Oncorhynchus – Pacific salmon and trout,  Salmo – Atlantic salmon and various trout, Salvelinus – char and trout).

Lake trout and most other trout live in freshwater lakes and rivers exclusively, while there are others, such as the steelhead, a form of the coastal rainbow trout, that can spend two or three years at sea before returning to fresh water to spawn (a habit more typical of salmon). Arctic char and brook trout are part of the char genus. Trout are an important food source for humans and wildlife, including brown bears, birds of prey such as eagles, and other animals. They are classified as oily fish.

Species
The name "trout" is commonly used for many (if not most) species in three of the seven genera in the subfamily Salmoninae: Salmo (Atlantic), Oncorhynchus (Pacific) and Salvelinus (circum-arctic). Fish species referred to as trout include:

 Genus Salmo, all extant species except Atlantic salmon
 Adriatic trout, Salmo obtusirostris
 Brown trout, Salmo trutta
 River trout, S. t. morpha fario
 Lake trout/Lacustrine trout, S. t. morpha lacustris
 Sea trout, S. t. morpha trutta
 Flathead trout, Salmo platycephalus
 Marble trout, Soca River trout or Soča trout – Salmo marmoratus
 Ohrid trout, Salmo letnica, S. balcanicus (extinct), S. lumi, and S. aphelios
 Sevan trout, Salmo ischchan

 Genus Oncorhynchus, six of the 12 extant species
 Apache trout, Oncorhynchus apache
 Biwa trout, Oncorhynchus masou rhodurus
 Cutthroat trout, Oncorhynchus clarki
 Coastal cutthroat trout, O. c. clarki
 Crescenti trout, O. c. c. f. crescenti
 Alvord cutthroat trout, O. c. alvordensis (extinct)
 Bonneville cutthroat trout, O. c. utah
 Humboldt cutthroat trout, O. c. humboldtensis
 Lahontan cutthroat trout, O. c. henshawi
 Whitehorse Basin cutthroat trout
 Paiute cutthroat trout, O. c. seleniris
 Snake River fine-spotted cutthroat trout, O. c. behnkei
 Westslope cutthroat trout, O. c. lewisi
 Yellowfin cutthroat trout, O. c. macdonaldi (extinct)
 Yellowstone cutthroat trout, O. c. bouvieri
 Colorado River cutthroat trout, O. c. pleuriticus
 Greenback cutthroat trout, O. c. stomias
 Rio Grande cutthroat trout, O. c. virginalis
 Gila trout, Oncorhynchus gilae
 Rainbow trout, Oncorhynchus mykiss
 Kamchatkan rainbow trout, Oncorhynchus mykiss mykiss
 Columbia River redband trout, Oncorhynchus mykiss gairdneri
 Coastal rainbow trout (steelhead), Oncorhynchus mykiss irideus
 Beardslee trout, Oncorhynchus mykiss irideus var. beardsleei
 Great Basin redband trout, Oncorhynchus mykiss newberrii
 Golden trout, Oncorhynchus mykiss aguabonita
 Kern River rainbow trout, Oncorhynchus mykiss aguabonita var. gilberti
 Sacramento golden trout, Oncorhynchus mykiss aguabonita var. stonei
 Little Kern golden trout, Oncorhynchus mykiss aguabonita var. whitei
 Kamloops rainbow trout, Oncorhynchus mykiss kamloops
 Baja California rainbow trout, Nelson's trout, or San Pedro Martir trout, Oncorhynchus mykiss nelsoni
 Eagle Lake trout, Oncorhynchus mykiss aquilarum
 McCloud River redband trout, Oncorhynchus mykiss stonei
 Sheepheaven Creek redband trout
 Mexican golden trout, Oncorhynchus chrysogaster

 Genus Salvelinus, five of the 52 extant species
 Brook trout, Salvelinus fontinalis
 Aurora trout, S. f. timagamiensis
 Bull trout, Salvelinus confluentus
 Dolly Varden trout, Salvelinus malma
 Lake trout, Salvelinus namaycush
 Silver trout, † Salvelinus agassizi (extinct)
Hybrids
 Tiger trout, Salmo trutta X Salvelinus fontinalis (infertile)
 Speckled Lake (Splake) trout, Salvelinus namaycush X Salvelinus fontinalis (fertile)

Fish from other families
Pseudaphritidae
 Genus Pseudaphritis
Sand trout, Pseudaphritis urvillii
 Sciaenidae
 Genus Cynoscion
 Spotted sea-trout, Cynoscion nebulosus

Anatomy
Trout that live in different environments can have dramatically different colorations and patterns. Mostly, these colors and patterns form as camouflage, based on the surroundings, and will change as the fish moves to different habitats. Trout in, or newly returned from the sea, can look very silvery, while the same fish living in a small stream or in an alpine lake could have pronounced markings and more vivid coloration; it is also possible that in some species, this signifies that they are ready to mate. In general, trout that are about to breed have extremely intense coloration and can look like an entirely different fish outside of spawning season. It is virtually impossible to define a particular color pattern as belonging to a specific breed; however, in general, wild fish are claimed to have more vivid colors and patterns.

Trout have fins entirely without spines, and all of them have a small adipose fin along the back, near the tail. The pelvic fins sit well back on the body, on each side of the anus. The swim bladder is connected to the esophagus, allowing for gulping or rapid expulsion of air, a condition known as physostome. Unlike many other physostome fish, trout do not use their bladder as an auxiliary device for oxygen uptake, relying solely on their gills.

There are many species, and even more populations, that are isolated from each other and morphologically different. However, since many of these distinct populations show no significant genetic differences, what may appear to be a large number of species is considered a much smaller number of distinct species by most ichthyologists. The trout found in the eastern United States are a good example of this. The brook trout, the aurora trout, and the (extinct) silver trout all have physical characteristics and colorations that distinguish them, yet genetic analysis shows that they are one species, Salvelinus fontinalis.

Lake trout (Salvelinus namaycush), like brook trout, belong to the char genus. Lake trout inhabit many of the larger lakes in North America, and live much longer than rainbow trout, which have an average maximum lifespan of seven years.

Habitat

Trout are usually found in cool, clear streams and lakes, although many of the species have anadromous strains as well. Young trout are referred to as troutlet, troutling or fry. They are distributed naturally throughout North America, northern Asia and Europe. Several species of trout were introduced to Australia and New Zealand by amateur fishing enthusiasts in the 19th century, effectively displacing and endangering several upland native fish species. The introduced species included brown trout from England and rainbow trout from California. The rainbow trout were a steelhead strain, generally accepted as coming from Sonoma Creek. The rainbow trout of New Zealand still show the steelhead tendency to run up rivers in winter to spawn.

In Australia the rainbow trout was introduced in 1894 from New Zealand and is an extremely popular gamefish in recreational angling.
Despite severely impacting the distribution and abundance of native Australian fish, such as the climbing galaxias, millions of rainbow and other trout species are released annually from government and private hatcheries.

The closest resemblance of seema trout and other trout family can be found in the Himalayan Region of India, Nepal, Bhutan, Pakistan and in Tian Shan mountains of Kyrgyzstan.

Diet

Trout generally feed on other fish, and soft bodied aquatic invertebrates, such as flies, mayflies, caddisflies, stoneflies, mollusks and dragonflies. In lakes, various species of zooplankton often form a large part of the diet. In general, trout longer than about  prey almost exclusively on fish, where they are available. Adult trout will devour smaller fish up to 1/3 their length. Trout  may feed on shrimp, mealworms, bloodworms, insects, small animal parts, and eel.

Trout who swim the streams love to feed on land animals, aquatic life, and flies. Most of their diet comes from macroinvertebrates, or animals that do not have a backbone like snails, worms, or insects. They also eat flies, and most people who try to use lures to fish trout mimic flies because they are one of trout's most fed on meals. Trout enjoy certain land animals, including insects like grasshoppers. They also eat small animals like mice when they fall in. (Although only large trout have mouths capable of eating mice.) They consume a diet of aquatic life like minnows or crawfish as well. Trout have a diverse diet they follow; they have plenty of different oppositions.

As food

As a group, trout are somewhat bony, but the flesh is generally considered to be tasty.  The flavor of the flesh is heavily influenced by the diet of the fish. For example, trout that have been feeding on crustaceans tend to be more flavorful than those feeding primarily on insect life.  Additionally, they provide a good fight when caught with a hook and line, and are sought after recreationally.  Because of their popularity, trout are often raised on fish farms and planted into heavily fished waters, in an effort to mask the effects of overfishing. Farmed trout and char are also sold commercially as food fish. Trout is sometimes prepared by smoking.

One fillet of trout (79 g) contains:
 Energy : 
 Fat (g): 5.22
 Carbohydrates (g): 0
 Fibers (g): 0
 Protein (g): 16.41
 Cholesterol (mg): 46

Trout fishing

River fishing
While trout can be caught with a normal rod and reel, fly fishing is a distinctive method developed primarily for trout, and now extended to other species. Understanding how moving water shapes the stream channel makes it easier to find trout. In most streams, the current creates a riffle-run-pool pattern that repeats itself over and over. A deep pool may hold a big brown trout, but rainbows and smaller browns are likely found in runs. Riffles are where fishers will find small trout, called troutlet, during the day and larger trout crowding in during morning and evening feeding periods.

 Riffles have a fast current and shallow water. This gives way to a bottom of gravel, rubble or boulder. Riffles are morning and evening feeding areas. Trout usually spawn just above or below riffles, but may spawn right in them.
 Runs are deeper than riffles with a moderate current and are found between riffles and pools. The bottom is made up of small gravel or rubble. These hot spots hold trout almost anytime, if there is sufficient cover.
 Pools are smoother and look darker than the other areas of the stream. The deep, slow-moving water generally has a bottom of silt, sand, or small gravel. Pools make good midday resting spots for medium to large trout.
 It is recommended that when fishing for trout, that the fisher(s) should use line in the 4–8 lb test for streamfish, and stronger line with the same diameter for trout from the sea or from a large lake, such as Lake Michigan. It is also recommended to use a hook size 8-5 for trout of all kind. Trout, especially farm-raised ones, tend to like salmon roes, worms, minnows, cut bait, maize, or marshmallows.

Ice fishing
Fishing for trout under the ice generally occurs in depths of 4 to 8 feet. Because trout are cold water fish, during the winter they move from up-deep to the shallows, replacing the small fish that inhabit the area during the summer. Trout in winter constantly cruise in shallow depths looking for food, usually traveling in groups, although bigger fish may travel alone and in water that's somewhat deeper, around 12 feet. Rainbow, Brown, and Brook trout are the most common trout species caught through the ice.

Trout fishing records
By information from International Game Fish Association (IGFA), the most outstanding records are:

 Brook trout caught by Dr. W. Cook in the Nipigon River, Canada, on July 1, 1916, that weighed 6.57 kg (14 lbs. 8 oz.)
 Cutthroat trout caught by John Skimmerhorn in Pyramid Lake located in Nevada, US, on December 1, 1925, that weighed 18.59 kg (41 lbs. 0 oz.)
 Bull trout caught by N. Higgins in Lake Pend Oreille located in Idaho, US, on October 27, 1949, that weighed 14.51 kg (32 lbs. 0 oz.)
 Golden trout caught by Chas Reed in Cooks Lake located in Wyoming, US, on August 5, 1948, that weighed 4.98 kg (11 lbs. 0 oz.)
 Rainbow trout caught by Sean Konrad  in Lake Diefenbaker, Canada, on September 5, 2009, that weighed 21.77 kg (48 lbs. 0 oz.)
 Lake trout caught by Lloyd Bull in Great Bear Lake, Canada, on August 19, 1995, that weighed 32.65 kg (72 lbs. 0 oz.)

Fishing baits

Declines in native trout populations 
Salmonid populations in general have been declining due to numerous factors, including invasive species, hybridization, wildfires, and climate change. Native salmonid fish in the western and southwestern United States are threatened by non-native species that were introduced decades ago. Non-native salmonids were introduced to enrich recreational fishing; however, they quickly started outcompeting and displacing native salmonids upon their arrival. Non-native, invasive species are quick to adapt to their new environment and learn to outcompete any native species, making them a force the native salmon and trout have to reckon with. Not only do the non-native fish drive the native fish to occupy new niches, but they also try to hybridize with them, contaminating the native gene construction. As more hybrids between native and non-native fish are formed, the lineage of the pure fish is continuously being contaminated by other species and soon may no longer represent the sole native species. The Rio Grande Cutthroat trout (Oncorhynchus clarki virginalis) are susceptible to hybridization with other salmonids such as rainbow trout (Oncorhynchus mykiss) and yield a new "cut-bow" trout, which is a contamination of both lineages’ genes. One solution to this issue is implemented by New Mexico Game and Fish hatcheries: stock only sterile fish in river streams. Hatcheries serve as a reservoir of fish for recreational activities but growing and stocking non-sterile fish would worsen the hybridization issue on a quicker, more magnified time scale. By stocking sterile fish, the native salmonids can't share genes with the non-native hatchery fish, thus, preventing further gene contamination of the native trout in New Mexico. Fire is also a factor in deteriorating Gila trout (Oncorhynchus gilae) populations because of the ash and soot that can enter streams following fires. The ash lowers water quality, making it more difficult for the Gila trout to survive. In some New Mexico streams, the native Gila trout will be evacuated from streams that are threatened by nearby fires and be reintroduced after the threat is resolved.

Climate change is also dwindling native salmonid populations. Climate change continually affects various cold-water fish, including trout. With an increase of temperature along with changes in spawning river flow, an abundance of trout species are effected negatively. In the past, a mere 8 °F increase was predicted to eliminate half of the native brook trout in the Southern Appalachian Mountains. Trout prefer cold water (50-60 °F) streams to spawn and live, but warming water temperatures are altering this ecosystem and further deteriorate native populations.

See also 

 List of smoked foods
 Trout tickling

References

Further reading 
 Robert J. Behnke, Trout and Salmon of North America. Illustrated by Joseph R. Tomelleri. New York: The Free Press, 2002.
 Jen Corrinne Brown, Trout Culture: How Fly Fishing Forever Changed the Rocky Mountain West. Seattle, WA: University of Washington Press, 2015.

External links

 
 Trout.co.uk – Website focused purely on fishing for trout
 Trout Unlimited – Conserving, protecting and restoring North America's coldwater fisheries and their watersheds
 "Trout Science," www.troutlet.com, 2000.

Fish common names
Salmonidae
Cold water fish
Commercial fish
Oily fish
Smoked fish
Sport fish
Holarctic fauna